Divandu albimarginatus is a species of cichlid native to the Republic of Congo and Gabon in Africa.  This species reaches a length of  SL.  It is currently the only known member of its genus.

References

Chromidotilapiini
Cichlid fish of Africa
Monotypic freshwater fish genera
Cichlid genera
Fish described in 2000